Boekel is a hamlet in the Dutch province of North Holland. It is a part of the municipality of Castricum, and lies about 5 km south of Alkmaar. Until January 1, 2002, Boekel belonged to the municipality of Akersloot. It had a population of about 10 in 2001.

Boekel is located on the west bank of the Noordhollandsch Kanaal. According to the 19th-century historian A.J. van der Aa, a castle was located here, also called "Boekel". It was destroyed by the Spanish army during the siege of Alkmaar, on October 3, 1574.

References

Populated places in North Holland